The Oranges is a 2011 American romantic comedy-drama directed by Julian Farino and starring Hugh Laurie, Leighton Meester, Catherine Keener, Oliver Platt, Allison Janney, Alia Shawkat, and Adam Brody. The film chronicles how two families deal with a scandal involving a married man and his friends' daughter. Set in The Oranges area of Essex County, New Jersey, The Oranges was primarily filmed in New Rochelle, New York. It premiered at the Toronto International Film Festival on September 10, 2011, and was released in the United States on October 5, 2012, by ATO Pictures. The film received mixed reviews upon its release.

Plot

The story is narrated from the perspective of aspiring furniture designer Vanessa Walling, whose plan to stay at home for a few months after college has turned into years. She witnesses the heartache between her parents as their marriage falls apart. Their best friends, Terry and Cathy Ostroff, live across the street in their suburb of West Orange, New Jersey.

When the Ostroffs' prodigal 24-year-old daughter Nina returns home after a failed engagement, Vanessa is unhappy to see her back. 
The mothers of both families would like to see Nina form a relationship with the Wallings' jet-setting son Toby, but Nina herself is more interested in Vanessa's father David. Cathy discovers the affair after following Nina to a motel and seeing David there as well. Thus begins the meltdown of both families.

Cast

The Wallings
 Hugh Laurie as David (father)
 Catherine Keener as Paige (mother)
 Adam Brody as Toby (son)
 Alia Shawkat as Vanessa (daughter)

The Ostroffs
 Oliver Platt as Terry (father)
 Allison Janney as Cathy (mother)
 Leighton Meester as Nina (daughter)

The Others
 Aya Cash as Maya
 Sam Rosen as Ethan
 Tim Guinee as Roger
 Cassidy Gard as Samantha
 Hoon Lee as Henry
 Heidi Kristoffer as Meredith
 Jennifer Bronstein as Amy
 Stephen Badalamenti as Taxi Driver
 John Srednicki as Waiter
 Betsy Aidem as Anne Allen

Production

Writing and casting

The script, written by Jay Reiss and Ian Helfer, appeared on 2008's Black List of best unproduced work; that list also featured The Beaver and Inglourious Basterds. Reiss and Helfer wrote the spec script, which is inspired by a story they heard from friends, during the Writers Guild of America strike. The film marks Julian Farino's debut as motion picture director; he had previously directed episodes of Entourage.

Richard Gere's agent Ed Limato called Farino to tell him Gere was interested in the script, but Farino wanted only Hugh Laurie to play the role of David because he had "that innate decency that could carry this thing". On February 8, 2010, Laurie was reported to be in talks to play his first feature lead role. Leighton Meester and Mila Kunis were also said to join the cast as his love interest. On February 28, it was confirmed that Meester had won the role over Kunis, while Adam Brody, Alia Shawkat, Catherine Keener and Allison Janney were all in negotiations.

Meester and Laurie had previously worked together when she guest-starred in two episodes of House, which had plot developments somewhat similar to the storyline of The Oranges. In the 2006 House episode "Lines in the Sand", Meester's character is a 17-year-old who relentlessly pursues Laurie's  "Dr. House" character, flirting with him and insisting that they should have sex— he eventually diagnoses that a fungal spore in her brain has resulted in her loss of inhibition and judgement. Farino knew Meester from Entourage where he directed her in the show's first season. He approached her while she was in the dressing room, preparing for a Gossip Girl episode shooting, and they made a "rushed audition". About her role, Meester said: "It’s a complete 180-degree turn from anything I’ve ever done. This fulfills something within myself that I could never find in my series [Gossip Girl]." Even though Alia Shawkat's name was the first mentioned by the casting director, Farino met with a lot of actresses for the role of Vanessa. Shawkat met Farino a year before she auditioned where he told her that they were considering Elliot Page for the part. After Page turned it down, Shawkat auditioned twice and was cast. Allison Janney and Oliver Platt had also worked together before in the television series The West Wing, while Catherine Keener and Platt had starred in the movie Please Give.

Filming
The ending was rewritten before shooting. During filming, Laurie, Meester, Janney, Platt, and Brody shared a house together. While the film is set in the fall, from Thanksgiving to Christmas in New Jersey, principal filmography started at the end of March 2010 in the upscale Beechmont section of New Rochelle in Westchester County, New York and lasted 29 days. Scenes were also shot in the neighboring Westchester communities of Mamaroneck and Bronxville, as well as the Tropicana Casino in Atlantic City, New Jersey. The film was shot with Red cameras. The narration was provided by Shawkat's character Vanessa whose voice-over was recorded in post-production during the editing of the film. ATO Pictures acquired the rights of distribution in September 2011.

Release

The film premiered at the Toronto International Film Festival on September 10, 2011 and opened the Montclair Film Festival on May 1, 2012. It received a limited release in the United States on October 5, 2012, being screened in 110 theaters. The film was released in the UK on December 7, 2012.

Critical response
The site's consensus is: "Despite the efforts of its accomplished cast, The Oranges suffers from a mediocre script that fails to deliver well-rounded characters, dramatic tension, or sufficient laughs." On Metacritic it has a weighted score of 46 out of 100, based on 23 critics, indicating "mixed or average reviews".

Giving it 3 stars out of 4, Moira Macdonald of The Seattle Times wrote highly of The Oranges, calling it "a superbly cast dark comedy;  it's a familiar story made fresh by actors who know how to make each breath matter." She found the film funny. The San Francisco Chronicle reviewer Mick LaSalle said that despite feeling sometimes "inauthentic," the film "breaks formula; its concerns are not the usual movie concerns, and it takes what might have been a standard plot in some unexpected directions. [...] The film just examines the interpersonal dynamics in an honest way. This leads to conflicts but also to unexpected and effective moments of tenderness between various characters." He wrote that Laurie and Platt "stand out" because of the good writing of their characters and that Meester embodies well the 24-year-old. Rafer Guzman of Newsday gave the film a 2-star rating out of 4 and wrote: "The Oranges hits and misses at random. Meester's Nina is absolutely radiant, but Laurie's David is a dour dullard. There are some genuinely moving moments, but the mayhem-in-suburbia slapstick falls flat. The film is certainly unpredictable, but that's partly because it doesn't know its own mind."

The Chicago Tribune critic Michael Phillips described the film as "a comedy rueful but tidy and safe," which sparked not much interest in him, and added that it is "a placid tale of impulses running wild." He, however, deemed the ensemble "excellent." The Star-Ledger writer Stephen Witty said that the film "has a few good lines, and a fine cast." He thought that Laurie was "particularly good," Keener amusing and Platt charming, but expected more of the film: "You want something that plays a little sharper, and cuts a little deeper. You want something that demands more of its performers, and delivers more to its audience." Similarly, New York Post Lou Lumenick wrote: "While there are laughs, the farcical elements of The Oranges are not presented with sufficient discipline to live up to the full potential of its cast." The Hollywood Reporter critic David Rooney praised members of the cast "who manage to hit a sweet spot even in this mediocre material," noting that the film "runs out of juice" when it becomes serious and that the film's "cathartic moments feel fabricated" and concluded that the cast "deserves better."

Stephen Holden of The New York Times said the film's problem is that its creators did not decide what genre The Oranges would be; "a dangerous comic satire or a serious dramatic downer," and instead made "a wishy-washy middle ground. As comedy, it isn’t funny; as serious drama, it lacks a moral and emotional center." Despite Vanessa (Alia Shawkat) "the most interesting character" praising her "sardonic perspective," the Los Angeles Times reviewer wrote that the film "never fully comes to life."  While Entertainment Weekly reviewer Owen Gleiberman  found Meester "charming," The Washington Post Michael O'Sullivan felt that lightness and brightness were missing from her performance and that she took the film too seriously.

Home media
The Oranges was released on DVD and Blu-ray on May 7, 2013.

References

External links
  
 
 
 
 
 

2011 films
2011 comedy films
2011 directorial debut films
2011 drama films
2011 romantic comedy-drama films
2010s English-language films
American romantic comedy-drama films
Films about dysfunctional families
Films directed by Julian Farino
Films scored by Klaus Badelt
Films set in New Jersey
Films shot in New Jersey
Films shot in New York (state)
2010s American films
Films shot in Atlantic City, New Jersey